Panaci is a commune located in Suceava County, Romania. It is composed of six villages: Catrinari, Coverca, Drăgoiasa, Glodu, Panaci, and Păltiniș.

References

Communes in Suceava County
Localities in Western Moldavia